Friedrich-Märker-Preis was a Bavarian prize given to essayists. It was named after the essayist Friedrich Märker.

From 1986 to 2002, the award was given annually by the Münchner Stiftung zur Förderung des Schrifttums of Munich. The prize money was €4,000. In addition, the foundation awarded the silver pen "for outstanding contributions to the teaching and dissemination of literature."

Winners of the Friedrich-Märker Preis

1989 Carl Amery
1990 Harald Weinrich 
1991 
1992 
1993 
1994 Wieland Schmied 
1995 Rüdiger Safranski 
1996 Christoph Dieckmann
1997 Hans Krieger
1999 Peter Sloterdijk
2000 Erwin Chargaff
2001 Peter von Matt
2002

References

Literary awards of Bavaria